Manley Justin Edwards (February 18, 1892 – May 8, 1962) was a barrister, teacher and Canadian federal politician.

Edwards ran as a Liberal candidate in the 1940 Canadian federal election. He defeated Douglas Cunnington, the Conservative Member of Parliament for Calgary West, in a hotly contested race. Edwards and George Henry Ross, who was elected in the same Liberal landslide victory, became the first two Liberal MPs to represent Calgary ridings. He served one term in office before retiring in 1945.

External links
 

1892 births
1962 deaths
Members of the House of Commons of Canada from Alberta
Liberal Party of Canada MPs
Calgary city councillors